Polýaigos is an uninhabited Greek island in the Cyclades near Milos and Kimolos. It is part of the community of Kimolos (Κοινότητα Κιμώλου). Its name means "many goats", since it is inhabited only by goats. It was mentioned by several ancient geographers: Ptolemy, Pliny the Elder, and Pomponius Mela.

It is very close to the island of Kimolos ( north west from Polyaigos) and to the island of Milos ( west from Polyaigos).

The island is to a great extent privately owned by the Greek Orthodox church, which sublets parts of it to local herdsmen from the nearby islands of Milos and Kimolos.

Its goat population maintains Polyaigos as a barren island. It has, however, some magnificent beaches, mainly on the southern part of the island, as well as many sea-surface caves, which serve as a refuge to a dwindling population of Mediterranean monk seals (Monachus monachus).

References 

Islands of Greece
Cyclades
Landforms of Milos (regional unit)
Islands of the South Aegean